Bethan Ellis Owen (born Bangor, Gwynedd) is a Welsh television actress best known for playing the character of Ffion Llewelyn in the Welsh soap Pobol y Cwm.

She was a pupil at Ysgol Gyfun Llanhari after moving to South Wales as a child.

References

External links

Year of birth missing (living people)
Living people
Welsh television actresses
People from Bangor, Gwynedd
People educated at Ysgol Gyfun Llanhari